Júnior Felício Marques or simply Ji-Paraná  (born June 11, 1987 in Ji-Paraná), is a Brazilian midfielder who most recently played for Paranavaí.

Career

Corinthians

Internacional
Ji joined Internacional from Corinthians on a 5-year contract from 23 October 2006. Inter later re-sold 45% economic rights to unknown parties for R$ 1million. Ji debuted for Inter in the Campeonato Gaucho in early 2007. On 16 March 2009 Inter loaned out the former Brazilian U-20 footballer to Campeonato Brasileiro Série B side Brasiliense. In August 2010 Junior Felício Marques moved to Hungarian side Győri ETO, one of the title contenders of the Hungarian premier league NB I. Internacional did not receive any fee but unknown fee was received by third parties owner.

Honours
Campeonato Brasileiro Série A: 2005.
Copa São Paulo de Juniores: 2005.

Contract
23 October 2006 to 22 October 2011

References

External links
 sambafoot

 Guardian Stats Centre
 zerozero.pt
 internacional.com.br

1987 births
Living people
People from Ji-Paraná
Brazilian footballers
Brazil under-20 international footballers
Association football midfielders
Sport Club Corinthians Paulista players
Sport Club Internacional players
Brasiliense Futebol Clube players
Grêmio Barueri Futebol players
Győri ETO FC players
Al-Ittihad Kalba SC players
FC Wacker Innsbruck (2002) players
Al-Mina'a SC players
Campeonato Brasileiro Série A players
Austrian Football Bundesliga players
Brazilian expatriate footballers
Expatriate footballers in Hungary
Brazilian expatriate sportspeople in Hungary
Expatriate footballers in the United Arab Emirates
Brazilian expatriate sportspeople in the United Arab Emirates
Expatriate footballers in Austria
Brazilian expatriate sportspeople in Austria
Expatriate footballers in Iraq
Brazilian expatriate sportspeople in Iraq
UAE Pro League players
Sportspeople from Rondônia